Achocalla Municipality is the third municipal section of the Pedro Domingo Murillo Province in the  La Paz Department, Bolivia. Its seat is Achocalla or Achuqalla in the native language.

See also
 Jach'a Quta

References 
 www.ine.gov.bo / census 2001: Achocalla Municipality

External links 
 Map of the Pedro Domingo Murillo Province

Municipalities of La Paz Department (Bolivia)